Lars "Lasse" Larsson (16 March 1962 – 8 March 2015) was a Swedish footballer who played as a striker. He represented IFK Trelleborg, Malmö FF, and Atalanta during a career that spanned between 1979 and 1993. A full international between 1984 and 1987, he won nine caps and scored one goal for the Sweden national team. He was the 1987 Allsvenskan top scorer.

Career
Larsson started his career in native Trelleborg at IFK Trelleborg. He later moved to Malmö FF where he enjoyed the most success of his career. He went on to play for Atalanta Bergamo in 1984 but missed the majority of the 1984-85 season due to injury which also made him return to Malmö after having only played four matches in Serie A. Back in Malmö Larsson was successful again and won a Swedish championship in 1986 and became Allsvenskan top scorer in 1987. After a very brief tenure in Trelleborgs FF again due to injury Larsson ended his career and started a coaching career. He died at the age of 52 in 2015.

Honours 
Malmö FF

 Swedish Champion: 1986, 1988

Individual

 Allsvenskan top scorer: 1986

References

1962 births
2015 deaths
Swedish footballers
Sweden international footballers
Sweden under-21 international footballers
Sweden youth international footballers
Malmö FF players
Trelleborgs FF players
Allsvenskan players
Association football forwards
People from Trelleborg
Footballers from Skåne County